Venice is a city in Madison County, Illinois, United States. The population was 1,498 at the 2020 census, down from 1,890 in 2010.

History
Venice was platted in 1841.

Geography
Venice is located in the southwest corner of Madison County at  (38.673796, -90.167885). It is bordered to the north and east by the city of Madison, to the south by the city of Brooklyn in St. Clair County, and to the west by the Mississippi River, across which is the city of St. Louis, Missouri.

Illinois Route 3 passes through the west side of Venice, leading north  to Alton and south  to East St. Louis. The McKinley Bridge crosses the Mississippi River from Route 3 in Venice to Interstate 70 in St. Louis.

Demographics

As of the census of 2000, there were 2,528 people, 950 households, and 661 families residing in the city. The racial makeup of the city was 5.50% White, 93.55% African American, 0.36% Native American, 0.04% Asian, and 0.55% from two or more races. Hispanic or Latino of any race were 0.75% of the population.

There were 950 households, out of which 34.5% had children under the age of 18 living with them, 22.6% were married couples living together, 41.8% had a female householder with no husband present, and 30.4% were non-families. 27.7% of all households were made up of individuals, and 10.6% had someone living alone who was 65 years of age or older. The average household size was 2.66 and the average family size was 3.25.

In the city, the population was spread out, with 33.3% under the age of 18, 9.3% from 18 to 24, 26.0% from 25 to 44, 19.3% from 45 to 64, and 12.1% who were 65 years of age or older. The median age was 31 years. For every 100 females, there were 79.4 males. For every 100 females age 18 and over, there were 71.0 males.

The median income for a household in the city was $19,853, and the median income for a family was $24,432. Males had a median income of $35,515 versus $22,411 for females. The per capita income for the city was $11,483. About 34.9% of families and 39.6% of the population were below the poverty line, including 55.7% of those under age 18 and 29.6% of those age 65 or over.

Notable people

 Ted Savage, outfielder for eight Major League Baseball teams; born in Venice

References

Cities in Madison County, Illinois
Cities in Illinois
Illinois populated places on the Mississippi River